The 1970–71 season was the 98th season of competitive football in Scotland and the 74th season of Scottish league football.

Scottish League Division One

Aberdeen, with a 15-game unbeaten run, led the league from December until the last week of the season. Aberdeen faced Celtic in their penultimate game, needing a win to almost certainly clinch the title, but could only draw 1–1 and then they lost their last game, at Falkirk, allowing Celtic to take the championship by 2 points.

Champions: Celtic 
Relegated: St Mirren, Cowdenbeath

Scottish League Division Two

Promoted: Partick Thistle, East Fife

Cup honours

Other honours

National

County

 – aggregate over two legs – play off – won on penalties

Highland League

Individual honours

Scotland national team

Key:
(H) = Home match
(A) = Away match
ECQG5 = European Championship qualifying – Group 5
BHC = British Home Championship

Notes and references

External links
Scottish Football Historical Archive

 
Seasons in Scottish football